Acorna is a "Unicorn Girl", a fantasy fiction character created by Anne McCaffrey and Margaret Ball in their novel Acorna: The Unicorn Girl (1997).

The Acorna Universe series includes ten science fantasy novels, the first two by McCaffrey and Ball, while the following ones were co-written by McCaffrey and Elizabeth Ann Scarborough (1999 to 2007). 
The Acorna series is a sub-set of the Federated Sentient Planets Universe. Other sub-sets include the Crystal Singer series, the Brain and Brawn Ship series and the Dragonriders of Pern series, all predominantly authored by Anne McCaffrey. Other contributors to the Acorna series include Jody Lynn Nye, Lyman Frakoss, Roman R. Ranieri and Mickey Zucker Reichert.

The series focuses primarily on the character, the orphaned Unicorn-girl introduced in the first book. Acorna has special powers including the abilities to heal, make things grow, detect venom, detect chemical imbalances, detect mineral and metal deposits, purify water and air, and communicate telepathically. The first book introduces her as a "youngling" and features her journey of understanding her individualism.

Acorna's appearance

Besides the single horn, situated halfway between her brow and her forehead, Acorna can, with the right attires, pass as a tall and graceful young lady. However, a closer look would reveal that she is not human. The following are her distinguishing features:
A flowing silvery mane from her head down to her back, similar to that of a horse. The same silvery curls are also on her calves.
Her feet end in equine hooves similar to those of traditional unicorn media. In cover art her feet are pictured looking as horse hooves.
Her fingers only have two joints, one at the knuckle and the other in the middle of her fingers. In cover art her hands are pictured as identical to those of humans.
Her eyes are silvery and her pupils narrow into a silver sliver when she is disappointed or sad.
Acorna is also born more mature than human infants and grows to adulthood within four years. She is unusually intelligent and can learn extremely quickly. Acorna is strictly vegetarian.

Origin

Acorna's parents eject her in an escape pod just before blowing up their own spaceship, deliberately killing themselves in order to destroy the pursuing Khleevi. Acorna's pod is found by space miners: Gill, Rafik, and Calum. They end up raising the unusual child as a daughter. Her upbringing with the miners is chronicled in Acorna: The Unicorn Girl.

Acorna's mother (avi) and father (lalli) are Feriila and Vaanye of the Renyilaaghe. Her mother is sister to Extraordinary Envoy Neeva (visedhaanye ferilii), as introduced to Delszaki Li in Acorna's Quest. Neeva tells Acorna that she has Feriila's eyes when they first meet. Her father was a scientist who 'had adapted his researches into the topology of space to weapons research shortly before his death'. An unexpected side-effect of her father's weapons technology transported Acorna's escape pod to where the miners found it.

Acorna's great-grandmother, Niikaavri of Clan Geeyiinah, was responsible for the design of the egg-ships use by Acorna's people. Acorna is also related to Grandam Naadiina, oldest resident on narhii-Vhiliinyar (New Home) and through her to Maati, Aari, Laarye and their parents, Miiri and Kaarlye.

Race

Acorna belongs to a race of humanoids called Linyaari. She finds this out in Acorna's Quest when she encounters her aunt ('mother-sister') and her fellow shipmates. The Linyaari are a peaceful race whose planet, Vhiliinyar, or "Home of the People", was invaded by the insect-like Khleevi, forcing them to move to narhii-Vhiliinyar, or "New Home of the People". They flee shortly before the Khleevi invasion, which destroys their home world Vhiliinyar in search of an unknown objective.

They are a beautiful race, tall and graceful, with abilities to heal wounds and purify substances such as air and water. They can also communicate telepathically with each other. Partially descended from unicorns, Ancestors who still live among them, cared for by specific attendants. Like the Ancestors, the Linyaari are a peace-loving people and do not tolerate violence in any of its forms, even going so far as to not have any military or weapons to speak of. The only weapon at all was being developed by Acorna's father and was a form of suicide that destroyed the user's ship and the Khleevis' as well.

Linyaari legend relates that unicorns were rescued from their native planet (Earth) by the Ancestral Friends or Ancestral Hosts to escape persecution by the new creatures, men. The Linyaari are products of genetic engineering, a blending of the Hosts and the unicorns. In a temporal paradox, Ancestral Host, Grimalkin, extracts one of the twin embryos from the mating of Acorna and Aari to create the Linyaari race. The series Acorna's Children chronicles the twins' independent lives and ultimate reunion.

Relationship

In the third book, Acorna's People, Acorna meets Aari, a Linyaari who was captured and tortured by the Khleevi after the evacuation of the home world. He feels that he has no reason to live, being physically broken and mentally scarred. Acorna is the first Linyaari he meets on his arrival and she does not shrink from his hornlessness as the other Linyaari cannot help doing. Although he is attracted to her, he believes that she is much too good for him.

After time spent together and many adventures, including a Khleevi nearly killing her, the feelings they have for each other emerge, but they are both shy. When they make it back to the Moon Of Opportunity, the children there use holograms to have them admit their feelings.

In the next book, Acorna's Search, Aari is kidnapped by a member of an ancient race of time travelers, called Grimalkin. Acorna follows them through time and space until, in the last book, Acorna's Triumph, she and Aari are reunited.

Acorna literature

Acorna
Acorna: The Unicorn Girl (1997)
The Unicorn Girl: The Illustrated Adventures (1997)
Acorna's Quest (1998)
Acorna's People (1999)
Acorna's World (2000)
Acorna's Search (2001)
Acorna's Rebels (2003)
Acorna's Triumph (2004)

Acorna's Children
First Warning (2005)
Second Wave (2006)
Third Watch (2007)

References

External links
 

 
Novels by Anne McCaffrey
Science fiction book series
Fantasy novel series
Characters in fantasy literature